If You Could See Me Now is Irish writer Cecelia Ahern's third novel, published in 2005.

Plot summary

Trapped in the stifling, small Irish town Baile na gCroíth, Elizabeth Egan had always been known as a serious woman, never laughing at jokes or taking joys from the simplest pleasure of life. This is due to having been abandoned by her free-spirited mother when she was young and was forced to grow up quickly to take care of her sister, Saoirse.

Taking advantage of Elizabeth's sense of responsibility, Saoirse has led life with abandonment, and when she gives birth to a son, Luke, she leaves Elizabeth to take care of him.

At the age of six, Luke claims to have a friend named Ivan whom Elizabeth cannot see. Though at first she is exasperated with this imaginary friend, she starts playing along with Luke when she learns that imaginary friends will only last about 3 months.

Though invisible to most, Ivan is real. Only Luke can see him, though he comes to realise that Elizabeth can feel his presence. Knowing that only people who are in real need of a friend are able to see him, he follows Elizabeth around. When, suddenly, she is able to see him, Ivan is delighted, but disappointed just as quickly when she thinks him to be the father of one of Luke's friends. A friendship which soon turns into romance blossoms between them.

Elizabeth meets Benjamin at work, and he asks her to dinner, but Ivan prevents her from going by inviting her out instead. Ivan's boss, Opal, sees his love for Elizabeth and tells him her own sad tale. She tells him that however much he wishes to be with Elizabeth a time will come when she will no longer be able to see him and will eventually age while he would remain young. However, Ivan is too much in love with Elizabeth and refuses to listen. To convince him, Opal takes him to see her own love, who has become an 80-year-old man while Opal has remained young.

One day, when Elizabeth is hosting a party, she is no longer able to see Ivan for a while and he realises it is time to move on to a new friend. Ivan visits Elizabeth one last time while she sleeps, explaining why he has to go. Elisabeth thinks it was a dream.
A few days later, Elizabeth realizes that it wasn't and that Ivan was Luke's 'imaginary' friend.

They go their separate ways, and not only Elizabeth but Ivan as well are changed by the experience. Elizabeth is more relaxed and Ivan admits that Elizabeth has been by far his favorite friend...

Characters
Elizabeth Egan - A 34-year-old interior designer who lives with her nephew Luke in a small city in Ireland. 
Ivan, - Luke's "imaginary" friend. 
Luke, - A very imaginative 6-years old boy. He is Elizabeth's nephew and Saoirse's son. 
Saoirse - Elizabeth's younger sister and Luke's mother.
Opal - Head of the "imaginary friends" association. 
Benjamin - Elizabeth's American co-worker. 
Brendan - Elizabeth's and Saoirse's father. 
Grainne - Elizabeth's and Saoirse's mother. 
Vincent Taylor - A rich and expansive American hotel manager who, even if he is mostly interested in making money, is searching actively for someone original to design the decoration of his hotel.
Joe - Manager of the local coffee shop Elizabeth frequents.
Becca - Elizabeth's 17-year-old assistant at her office and a calm and intelligent girl.
Poppy - Elizabeth's other assistant, a funny and original 25-year-old young woman who always wants to paint things in bright and vivid colors. She also loves to create new objects or inventions.
Sam - Luke's best friend. 
Fiona - Sam's mother.

Film adaptation
In 2005, Disney has acquired rights to adapt the novel into a musical with Hugh Jackman as Ivan.

References

External links

2005 Irish novels
Novels by Cecelia Ahern
Novels set in Ireland
HarperCollins books